Bartel may refer to:

Bartel, one of the companions of Saint Nicholas

Given name
Bartel J. Jonkman (1884–1955), U.S. politician
Bartel Leendert van der Waerden (1903–1996), Dutch mathematician

Surname
Beate Bartel, a member of the German band Liaisons Dangereuses
Jimmy Bartel (born 1983), Australian rules footballer
Jonny Ray Bartel, member of the American band The Knitters
Kazimierz Bartel (1882–1941), Polish mathematician, diplomat and politician
Mateusz Bartel (1985), Polish chess grandmaster
Max Bartel (1879–1914), German entomologist
Paul Bartel (1938–2000), American actor, writer and director
Richard Bartel (born 1983), American football player
Ryszard Bartel (1897–1982) Polish aeronautical engineer and aircraft designer

See also
 Bartell (disambiguation)
 Bartels (disambiguation)

Russian Mennonite surnames